Marilla Adams (1864 – November 2, 1966) was a Canadian artist.

Biography
Adams was born in 1864 in Zorra, Ontario. She attended Alma College, a women's college in St. Thomas, Ontario. There she studied under Frederic Marlett Bell-Smith along with Cornelia Saleno and Eva Brook Donly. She continued her education at the Ontario School of Art, the School of Design in New York, and the Art Association of Montreal.

Adams taught for a time at Simpson College in Indianola, Iowa, before traveling to Europe. Around the beginning of World War I, she returned to Canada. She settled in Montréal, Quebec, where she taught weaving and wood carving to wounded soldiers. In January 1926, she reviewed the work of charitable organizations in the city, and spoke on behalf of the ones she felt did the most to "alleviate handicaps of the underprivileged".

She died in Montréal on November 2, 1966.

References

1864 births    
1966 deaths
OCAD University alumni
Artists from Ontario
Canadian women artists
Canadian centenarians
Women centenarians
Date of birth unknown